Rothschild is a German surname. It may also refer to:

People 
 Rothschild family, a European dynasty of German Jewish origin that established European banking and finance houses from the late eighteenth century
Rothschild banking family of England, subset of the Rothschild family
 Baron Rothschild, a British peerage
 Baron Rothschild (Austria)

Banks 
 Rothschild & Co, known as “Rothschild,” an investment bank / private bank / financial services firm held by the Rothschild banking family and formed from the merger of Paris Orléans and N M Rothschild & Sons
 L.F. Rothschild, a defunct U.S. investment bank, acquired in 1988
 LCF Rothschild Group, the private bank of the Rothschild banking family of France

Places 
 Palais Rothschild, palaces in Vienna
 Hôtel Salomon de Rothschild, a palace in Paris
 Rothschild Boulevard, a major street in Tel Aviv
 Rothschild Island
 Walter Rothschild Zoological Museum, Tring
 Rothschild, Wisconsin
New Court, the historical and present headquarters of Rothschild

Vineyards 
 Château Lafite Rothschild, French vineyard
 Château Mouton Rothschild, French vineyard
 Château Clarke, French vineyard
 Château des Laurets, French vineyard

Other uses 
 Rothschild giraffe
 Rothschild Rh, Higurashi no Naku Koro ni Kai ending theme song
 Rothschild (Fabergé egg)

See also